St. John the Baptist's Church is a wooden chapel of ease located in Wędrynia, Kluczbork County in Poland.

The church was built in 1791. The church tower was built in 1818. The church was renovated in 1959. The church is based on the construction of a log house, with a tri-point closed-off chancel, built in the Baroque architectural style. The narrow-sided tower originates from 1818, whilst the ridge turret is covered with a gourd-like apex. The church contains a late-Baroque main altar with statues of two bishop saints and paintings of Saints  Augustine of Hippo or Zechariah and one of St. John the Baptist.

References

Kluczbork County
Wędrynia